Érick Daniel Sánchez Ocegueda (born 27 September 1999), also known as El Chiquito, is a Mexican professional footballer who plays as a midfielder for Liga MX club Pachuca and the Mexico national team.

Club career
Sánchez debuted on the top level Mexican League Liga BBVA Bancomer against Toluca on 7 August 2016 when he was only 16 years old. Sánchez has played in all of Pachuca's youth divisions such as Under-15, Under-17, Under-20, Second Division and his appearance in the First Division team. Through his young career he has played off eight finals, two with U-15 and six with U-17 team category.

International career
Sánchez was called up by Gerardo Martino to participate with the senior national team at the 2021 CONCACAF Gold Cup and made his debut on 14 July 2021 in a game against Guatemala.

In October 2022, Sánchez was named in Mexico's preliminary 31-man squad for the World Cup, but did not make the final 26.

Career statistics

Club

International

International goals
Scores and results list Mexico's goal tally first.

Honours
Pachuca
Liga MX: Apertura 2022

References

External links
 
  
 
 

Living people
1999 births
Mexican footballers
Mexico international footballers
Association football midfielders
C.F. Pachuca players
Mineros de Zacatecas players
Liga MX players
Ascenso MX players
Liga Premier de México players
Footballers from Mexico City
2021 CONCACAF Gold Cup players